A perennial candidate is a political candidate who frequently runs for public office without a reasonable chance of winning. The term is the opposite of an incumbent politician who repeatedly defends their seat successfully. In the U.S., perennial candidates are usually affiliated with third party politics.

Generally speaking, candidates are considered perennial if they seek a specific elected office or general high office (such as president, governor, congressperson or mayor) more than three times without success.

The United States, a representative democracy with low hurdles to running for elected office, has a long tradition of perennial candidates.

Notable American perennial presidential candidates

Local, statewide and federal candidates 

 Cris Ericson, Vermont
 Larry Kilgore, Texas
 Mike Schaefer, California
 Willie Wilson, Illinois

Eastern states 
 William Bryk, New Hampshire retired attorney, won 2018 election to the Antrim Town Planning Board, formerly resident in New York, has run for multiple offices, including running for the U.S. Senate in 4 states simultaneously in 2014.
 Pasquale Caggiano, seven-time candidate for Mayor of Lynn, Massachusetts. Elected on his final attempt, but died three months into his term. He had previously served as a member of the Lynn City Council and the Massachusetts House of Representatives. Unsuccessful Candidate for the United States House of Representatives in Massachusetts's 7th congressional district in 1956, Lieutenant Governor in 1960 and 1962, Governor of Massachusetts in 1964 and the Massachusetts House of Representatives in 1968.
 Guy Carbone, a Massachusetts Democrat turned Republican, has run unsuccessfully for Northern District District Attorney in 1978 and 1982, Governor of Massachusetts in 1986, Massachusetts Attorney General in 1990, 1994, and 2010, the U.S. House of Representatives in 1996, the Massachusetts Senate in 1998, and most recently Selectman, Town of Belmont, Massachusetts. He also ran for governor in 1982 and 1990 before dropping out to pursue another office.
 Mike Causey, a North Carolina Republican, has run for state Insurance Commissioner five times between 1992 and 2016, losing each of the first four times in 1992, 1996, 2000, and 2012. In his 2016 campaign, his fifth campaign for the same office, he knocked off incumbent Wayne Goodwin in what was considered to be an upset, given his previous track record and Goodwin's incumbency. In addition to losing all of those statewide races for the same office, Causey has run and lost races for Congress and the state legislature. He's been described as the "Harold Stassen of North Carolina" regarding his continuous statewide losses for the same Council of State office.
 Peter Diamondstone ran in many elections in Vermont from 1970 until 2016; he died in 2017. He usually ran under the Liberty Union Party, but occasionally ran in Democratic and Republican primaries.
 Greg Fischer, has run, unsuccessfully, for elected office in New York 16 times. He has run for United States Congress (2020), New York State Comptroller (2014), New York State Senate (2008, 2010, 2016, 2018), Suffolk County Executive (2019), Riverhead Town Supervisor (2011), Riverhead Town Council (2007), Riverhead Town Tax Assessor (2013, 2015), and Riverhead School Board (2014, 2015, 2016, 2017, 2018). He generally ran as a Democrat, but at times ran on the Working Families, Riverhead First, and The Rent is Too Damn High lines.
 Gatewood Galbraith, a politician known for his outspoken advocacy of civil liberties and legalization of marijuana, ran unsuccessfully for state and federal offices in his home state of Kentucky no fewer than nine times. He ran twice for the U.S. House, once for state agriculture commissioner, once for the state attorney general, and five times for governor. His final run for governor ended less than two months before his death in January 2012.
 Althea Garrison has run unsuccessfully in multiple elections for the Massachusetts General Court, Boston City Council, and Mayor of Boston as a Republican, Democrat, and independent. Elected to one term in the Massachusetts House of Representatives from 1993 to 1995. As the runner-up in the 2017 Boston City Council election election, she served one year on the Boston City Council to complete the term of Ayanna Pressley, upon Pressley assuming office in the U.S. House of Representatives in January 2019. Garrison was the first transgender or transsexual person to be elected to a state legislature in the United States.
 Calvin H. Gurley, an accountant who has run for elected office in the District of Columbia in thirteen different elections between 1986 and 2020
 Robert Hagopian, ran unsuccessfully for public office in Hamilton, Massachusetts about twenty times. Previously served as treasurer of Watertown, Massachusetts from 1955 to 1967.
 Howie Hawkins, an activist and co-founder of the Green Party of the United States. Has to date run for office and lost 23 times.
 Robert J. Healey unsuccessfully ran for Governor of Rhode Island in 1986, 1994, 1998, and 2014. He also ran for Lieutenant Governor in 2002, 2006, and 2010.
 Abraham "Honest Abe" Hirschfeld, a New York City businessman, ran unsuccessful campaigns for the U.S. Senate in 1974 (defeated in Democratic primary) and 2004 (on a minor party line), for the New York City Council, for Manhattan Borough President in 1997, for Lieutenant Governor of New York, for New York State Comptroller in 1998, and for Mayor of Miami Beach, Florida.
 John Jay Hooker, a Tennessee Democrat, ran for several Tennessee offices, in later years mainly to gain standing for lawsuits against more serious candidates on the grounds of campaign finance violations.
 Steve Lonegan, a New Jersey Republican, was elected to three terms as mayor of Bogota, but has lost multiple bids for other offices. He was the unsuccessful Republican nominee for State Senate in New Jersey's 37th legislative district in 1997, New Jersey's 9th congressional district in 1998, a special U.S. Senate election in 2013. He also lost in the Republican primaries for Governor of New Jersey in 2005 and 2009, New Jersey's 3rd congressional district in 2014 and New Jersey's 5th congressional district in 2018.
 George P. Mahoney, a building contractor who undoubtedly with his candidacies led to the creation of a future Vice President. Mahoney, a conservative Democrat from Maryland who ran for U.S. Senate in 1952, 1956, 1958, 1968, and 1970 and for Governor of Maryland as a Democrat in 1950, 1954, 1962, and 1966. Mahoney won the Democratic nomination for governor in 1966 with just 30% of the vote. U.S. Representative Carlton R. Sickles (30%) and Attorney General of Maryland Thomas B. Finan (27%) split the vote and allowed Mahoney, who ran on a segregationist and anti-open housing campaign to triumph. In the general election, Mahoney's slogan, "Your home is your castle; protect it", as well as his stance on many civil rights issues, prompted Baltimore City Comptroller Hyman A. Pressman to enter the race as an Independent candidate. Mahoney's controversial stances caused many liberals in the Maryland Democratic Party to split their support between Spiro Agnew, due to his pro-civil rights, socially moderate views, and Pressman. This split helped Agnew to win the election with a plurality, taking 70% of the black vote. Agnew in 1969 became Vice President of the United States under Richard Nixon.
 Basil Marceaux, during the 2010 election cycle filed as a candidate for the Republican nominations for governor in the Tennessee gubernatorial election and U.S. House of Representatives in Tennessee's 3rd congressional district. Before his 2010 candidacies for governor and the U.S. House, Marceaux had previously run as a candidate for the Tennessee State Senate three times, the United States Senate once and the Governor of Tennessee in three separate elections.
 Jimmy McMillan, founder of the Rent Is Too Damn High Party, has run for Mayor of New York City in 1993, 2005, 2009 and 2013, US Senate in 2000, Governor of New York in 1994, 2006, and 2010, and President of the United States in 2012.
 Marcus Morton, candidate for Governor of Massachusetts every year from 1828 to 1843. He won twice (1839 and 1842). His 1839 victory came in the closest governor's race in the United States history.
 John Randolph Neal Jr. unsuccessfully ran for U.S. Senator 18 times, for Governor of Tennessee 9 times, and for the U.S. House of Representatives variously as a Democrat and Independent.
 John Raese, a Republican, unsuccessfully ran for the U.S. Senate from West Virginia in 1984, 2006, 2010, and 2012. Raese also ran for Governor in 1988, but lost the Republican primary.
 Sam Sloan, a polymath with interests in board games, obscure foreign languages, and over-the-counter stock trading, has run for Governor of New York in every election since 2006, for the U.S. Presidency in 2012 and 2016, New York City Mayor in 2009 and 2013, New York's 15th congressional district in 2014 and New York's 13th congressional district in 2016. He has run as a Democrat, a Libertarian, and under various third parties.
 Milton Street ran for Mayor of Philadelphia in 2007, 2011, and 2015 (but withdrew in 2007 to run for an at-large City Council seat instead) and for US Congress in 1984. A businessman and activist, he was elected to the Pennsylvania House of Representatives in 1978 and the Pennsylvania State Senate in 1980, but lost his first reelection in 1984. He is the older brother of former Philadelphia Mayor John Street
 Jay Wolfe was elected to one term in the West Virginia State Senate, but unsuccessfully ran for the U.S. Senate from West Virginia as the Republican nominee in 1988, 2002, and 2008.
 Russell A. Wood, Massachusetts State Auditor from 1939 to 1941. Unsuccessful candidate for Massachusetts Secretary of the Commonwealth in 1911, 1912, 1913, 1914, and 1950, Middlesex County Register of Probate and Insolvency in 1924 and 1926, Treasurer and Receiver-General of Massachusetts in 1928 and 1930, Massachusetts Governor's Council in 1932 and 1934, and Massachusetts State Auditor in 1936, 1940, 1942, 1944, 1946, and 1948.
 Prince Mongo ran unsuccessfully for Mayor of Memphis, Tennessee ever since 1979. He has never won an election.

Central states 
Gil Carmichael ran unsuccessfully for the Mississippi State Senate in 1966 and 1967, the United States Senate in 1972, Governor of Mississippi in 1975 and 1979, and Lieutenant Governor of Mississippi in 1983.
 Jacob Coxey best known for his 1894 March on Washington DC, Coxey ran 3 times for US Senate for Ohio, and twice as the People's Party nominee for Governor of Ohio in 1895 and 1897. Coxey also was the Mayor of Massilon, OH from 1931 to 1933 in addition to losing numerous congressional races.
 Joe Exotic is a former zookeeper and convict, known for his G.W. Zoo and made especially famous by the documentary series Tiger King. He has run unsuccessfully for public office two times notably and three times in total. Exotic first ran for President of the United States in 2016 as an independent and then for Governor of Oklahoma in 2018 as a Libertarian. Exotic filed to run for the Libertarian nomination in 2020 before his gubernatorial run.
 Arthur J. Jones is a Neo-Nazi who unsuccessfully pursued the Republican nomination in Illinois's 3rd congressional district seven times since 1984 before winning the nomination unopposed in 2018, and then losing in the general election. His candidacy was strongly denounced by national and local party officials. Additionally, he has lost bids for Mayor of Milwaukee, Mayor of Chicago, and Chicago City Council.
 James D. Martin, one of the first Republican politicians to make an electoral impact in the once solid-Democratic state of Alabama, ran for the U.S. Senate three times and governor of Alabama once in the 1960s and 1970s, and also unsuccessfully sought the office of state treasurer in 1994. By the time of Martin's 1978 Senate campaign, his opponent had already acknowledged him as the "Harold Stassen of Alabama."
 Jim Oberweis, a dairy magnate, has run for office in Illinois multiple times. He lost in the Republican primaries for the U.S. Senate in 2002, 2004 and Governor in 2006, and was the unsuccessful Republican nominee for the special and regular elections in Illinois's 14th congressional district in 2008 and 2020 and the U.S. Senate in 2014. However, he was elected to the Illinois Senate in 2012 and reelected in 2016.
 Claude R. Porter unsuccessfully ran as a Democrat three times for Iowa governor and six times for U.S. senator.
 Jim Rogers, an Oklahoma Democrat notorious for his secrecy and almost complete lack of campaigning, ran for the state's two U.S. Senate seats every election from 2002 to 2014, serving as the Democratic nominee in the 2010 U.S. Senate election. He died less than two weeks after his last race in 2012; Rogers also ran in the 2012 Oklahoma Democratic presidential primary, finishing in third place with 15% of the vote.
 Rick Stewart, founder of Frontier Natural Products Co-Op, has run unsuccessfully in Iowa for U.S. Senate (2014, 2020), Linn County Sheriff (2016), Secretary of Agriculture (2018), and governor (2022).

Western states
 Mark Callahan has sought numerous offices under several different parties since 2009, including the Oregon House of Representatives, the United States House of Representatives, the United States Senate, several boards of education, and President of the United States. As of April 2020, his sole victories in a contested election was the Republican primary for the U.S. Senate from Oregon in 2016 and the Republican Primary for Oregon's Fourth Congressional District in 2018. He subsequently lost both general elections.
 John Carroll served four terms in the Hawaii House of Representatives and one term in the Hawaii Senate, but also ran unsuccessfully for Governor of Hawaii in 2002, 2010, and 2018, for the United States House of Representatives in 1966 and 2002, and for the United States Senate in 2000, 2012, and 2016.
 Campbell Cavasso served three terms in the Hawaii House of Representatives, but unsuccessfully ran for Lieutenant Governor of Hawaii in 2002, the United States Senate in 2004, 2010, and 2014, and for the United States House of Representatives in 2018.
 Rocky De La Fuente has unsuccessfully run for President of the United States on multiple tickets, for senate in nine different states in the same election and for the Mayor of New York, and has never been elected to any office.
 Goodspaceguy, who legally changed his name from Michael George Nelson, has run for local, state, and federal office in Washington state more than a dozen times.
 Eddie Hamilton, a Nevada Republican, runs on an almost yearly basis. He has run for Nevada's 1st Congressional District in 2008, Governor of Nevada in 2014, Henderson City Council in 2011 and 2015, US Senate in 2006, 2010 (as a Democrat), 2012 and 2016, Mayor of Henderson in 2013 and 2017. Each time he runs, he uses a different nickname such as "Fast Eddie", "Mr. Clean" "In Liberty" and "Swamper".
 Robert Kelleher unsuccessfully ran for public office 16 times on various party tickets, including a bid for the Presidency in 1976, four runs for Governor of Montana in 1980, 1984, 1992, and 1996, and three runs for Senator from Montana in 1988, 2002, and 2008.
 Stan Lippman, a disbarred attorney and anti-vaccination activist, has unsuccessfully run for office more than eight times in the state of Washington.
 Uncle Mover, known for many years as Mike The Mover, who was born Michael Shanks but legally changed his name twice, has run for public office in Washington state more than 17 times to help promote his furniture moving business.
 Richard Pope, a Bellevue, Washington, attorney, has run for local and state office in Washington state a dozen times, though has yet to be elected.
 Pro-Life, born Marvin Richardson, is an Idaho farmer who is well known for his staunch opposition to abortion which inspired his name change has run as an independent or as a Constitution Party candidate for the state House of Representatives, governor, and both houses of the United States Congress. He has expressed a commitment to continue running for public office until his death.
 Rex Rammell unsuccessfully ran for the Republican nomination for the Idaho House of Representatives in 2002, 2004, and 2012, for Governor of Idaho in 2010 and for Representative from Wyoming in 2016. He also unsuccessfully ran as an independent for Senator from Idaho in 2008 and as the Constitution nominee for Governor of Wyoming in 2018.
 Art Robinson unsuccessfully ran as a Republican for a U.S. House seat in Oregon in 2010, 2012, 2014, 2016, and 2018.
 Danny Tarkanian, a Republican businessman from Las Vegas and son of UNLV Basketball coach Jerry Tarkanian and Las Vegas City Councilwoman Lois Tarkanian. He has run for Nevada State Senate, Secretary of State, US Senate in 2010 and 2018, Nevada System of Higher Education and Nevada's 4th and 3rd districts in 2012 and 2016 respectively. He did not reside in either congressional district during his last two campaigns.
 Glen H. Taylor, a Democrat known as "The Singing Cowboy," ran for Congress in Idaho seven times (1938, 1940, 1942, 1944, 1950, 1954 and 1956). His 1944 Senate run was his only successful campaign. Taylor was also the Progressive Party vice presidential nominee in 1948.

National
 John H. Cox, a Republican talk radio host, has run for various positions in his home state of Illinois including U.S. Congress, U.S. Senate, and Cook County Recorder of Deeds, the latter in an attempt to eliminate the position; which he saw as unnecessary. Cox ran unsuccessfully for the 2008 Republican nomination for President of the United States. He was the Republican nominee in the 2018 California gubernatorial election after placing second in the nonpartisan blanket primary, losing the general election to Democrat Gavin Newsom.
 Eugene V. Debs was a presidential candidate for the Social Democratic Party in 1900 and thereafter for the Socialist Party in four more elections: 1904, 1908, 1912, and 1920. In the 1920 election, while in federal prison for violating the Espionage Act of 1917 with a speech opposing the draft, he received 913,664 votes, the most ever for a Socialist Party presidential candidate.
 Earl Dodge, a long-time activist in the temperance movement, was the Prohibition Party's presidential candidate in six consecutive elections, from 1984 to 2004. He was also that party's vice-presidential candidate in 1976 and 1980. He ran for Governor of Colorado on five occasions (1970, 1974, 1982, 1986, and 1994) as well. He also ran for senator of Kansas in 1966.
 David Duke, American white supremacist, activist, antisemitic conspiracy theorist, Holocaust denier, a convicted felon, and former Grand Wizard of the Ku Klux Klan. A former Republican Louisiana State Representative, Duke was a candidate in the Democratic presidential primaries in 1988 and the Republican presidential primaries in 1992. Duke also ran unsuccessfully for the Louisiana State Senate, United States Senate, United States House of Representatives, and for Governor of Louisiana.
 Jack Fellure ran for the Republican Party nomination in every presidential election from 1988 to 2016, and declared that he will run in 2020. In the 2012 campaign, he withdrew from the Republican nomination race, and become the presidential nominee of the Prohibition Party.
 Howie Hawkins, co-founder of the Green Party, has run in over 20 elections since 1993, never winning.
 Alan Keyes, former assistant secretary of state and conservative activist, ran for President of the United States in 1996, 2000, and 2008. He was the Republican nominee for the U.S. Senate in Maryland against Paul Sarbanes in 1988 and Barbara Mikulski in 1992, as well as in Illinois against Barack Obama in 2004. Keyes lost all three elections by wide margins.
 Gloria La Riva, a socialist activist, has run as either a presidential or vice-presidential candidate in every U.S. presidential election since 1984.
 Lyndon LaRouche, a fringe political figure, ran for president of the United States in eight elections, beginning in 1976. He ran once as a U.S. Labor Party candidate and seven times as a Democrat. In 1992, he campaigned while in federal prison. Many of his followers have also run for office repeatedly, including Sheila Jones and Elliott Greenspan, both of whom made eight campaigns for a variety of offices.
 Andy Martin (also known as Anthony Martin-Trigona), a journalist and self-described consumer advocate has run for several local, state and federal offices dating back to at least 1977, including two runs for president and six runs for Senate. He has run as a Democrat, a Republican, and as an independent.
 Pat Paulsen, a comedian best known for his appearances on the Smothers Brothers Comedy Hour, first ran for president in 1968 as both a joke and a protest. He ran again in 1972 and in succeeding elections until 1996, one year prior to his death.

More

 Shawn O'Hara, a member of the Reform Party, ran for office 52 times over his career, including 19 runs for the United States Senate and 5 runs for Governor of Mississippi.
 Harold Stassen is perhaps the most famous and distinguished perennial presidential candidate in U.S. history, along with Ralph Nader. A one-time governor of Minnesota and former president of the University of Pennsylvania, he ran for the Republican nomination for president nine times between 1944 and 1992. While Stassen was considered a serious candidate in 1944, 1948, and 1952, his persistent attempts were increasingly met with derision and then amusement as the decades progressed. He also ran in 10 other races for lower offices.
 Jill Stein, a physician and member of the Green Party. Stein has run for Governor of Massachusetts in 2002 and 2010, president in 2012 and 2016, Massachusetts House of Representatives in 2004 and Secretary of the Commonwealth in 2006. However, she was elected to the Town of Lexington Town Meeting Representative in 2005 and 2008.
 Vermin Supreme, former candidate for Mayor of Baltimore, Mayor of Detroit, Mayor of Mercury, Nevada, campaigned in the Democratic Party primary in 2004 and 2016, and in New Hampshire Republican Party primary in 2008 and 2012
 Randall Terry is an anti-abortion activist who has run for numerous positions in the national and state governments, including the president. He is notorious for getting glitterbombed by candidate Vermin Supreme at the 2012 lesser-known Democratic presidential debate.
 Norman Thomas was the Socialist Party's candidate for President of the United States on six occasions from 1928 to 1948 inclusive. He also ran for Governor of New York in 1924, for Mayor of New York in 1925, for New York State Senate in 1926, for Alderman in 1927, for Mayor of New York again in 1929, and for the US Senate in New York in 1934. Unlike most other perennial candidates, Thomas influenced American politics to a considerable degree with many of his policies being appropriated by President Franklin D. Roosevelt's New Deal.
 Don Wright, as president of the Alaska Federation of Natives during the early 1970s, played a major role in the passage of the Alaska Native Claims Settlement Act.  However, Wright is far better known as a perennial candidate, having run for statewide office in Alaska 15 times since 1968. Wright has run for governor of Alaska 11 consecutive times since 1974. Wright ran 7 of those campaigns under a major party but lost in the primary election each time. The remaining four times (1978, 2002, 2006 and 2010), he was the nominee of the Alaskan Independence Party.

References

Lists of American political candidates